Matt Deakin (born May 20, 1980) is an American competition rower, Olympic champion and world champion.

Deakin was born in San Francisco, California. He won a gold medal in coxed eights at the 2004 Summer Olympics, as a member of the American team. The time 5:19.85 was a new world record.  He is a graduate of the University of Washington and a member of the New York Athletic Club Hall of Fame.

References

1980 births
Rowers at the 2004 Summer Olympics
Olympic gold medalists for the United States in rowing
Living people
American male rowers
World Rowing Championships medalists for the United States
Medalists at the 2004 Summer Olympics